United Cube Concert – One was the second domestic concert of South Korean music label Cube Entertainment in 2018. The concert takes place at KINTEX in Seoul with an audience of 8,500 people.

Summary

On May 4, 2018, Cube Entertainment announced through its official SNS that it will hold a family concert titled United Cube -ONE-. The event took place at KINTEX, Ilsan on June 16. The concert marks the agency's first family concert in five years since United Cube – Cube Party in 2013. Ticket went on sale online started on May 9, 2018, at 8 PM  and was sold out in two minutes.

On June 14, Cube Entertainment revealed that Jo Kwon, BTOB’s Eunkwang and Im Hyun-sik, CLC’s Sorn and Seunghee, Pentagon's Hui and Jinho, and (G)I-DLE’s Miyeon and Minnie prepared a special stage at Mnet’s M Countdown and KBS2’s Music Bank under the name 'United Cube' where they perform a song called 'One Step'. The song was composed and written by Hyunsik about hope and comfort with a message that no matter how tired and worn out you are, as long as you keep taking one step forward towards your dream, you will reach it one day.

On the day of the concert, a press conference was held to commemorate the opening of '2018 UNITED CUBE -ONE-' at 2nd KINTEX Exhibition Center. CUBE TV Hangtime app aired the concert for the audience who were unable to attend the concert. Twenty live video feeds from the concert and from backstage were used to produce twelve live streams.

The concert last a total of four hours which featured performances by a total of thirty-three Cube artists including HyunA, Jo Kwon, BTOB, CLC, Pentagon, (G)I-DLE and Yoo Seon-ho. Triple H gave a sneak preview of their new song Retro Future ahead of their comeback. Lai Guan-lin made a surprise appearance on stage for the encore with his fellow labelmates.

On June 17, Cube released 'Upgrade', 'Mermaid', 'Follow Your Dreams' (한걸음) and 'Young & One' from its family concert "United Cube One" through several music portals, including Melon and iTunes.

Performers
A total of 33 singers participated in the concert.

 Jo Kwon
 Hyuna
 BtoB
 CLC
 Pentagon
 Lai Kuan-lin 
 Yoo Seon-ho
 (G)I-dle
 Triple H

Set list
This set list is representative of the show on June 16, 2018.

Intro & VCR
 Young & One 
 Maze 
 Latata 
 Light My Body Up (David Guetta cover) 
 One Blue Star 
 Maybe Spring 
 Hyung 
 Don't Worry (My Annoying Brother OST) 
 I Like It 
 Hobgoblin 
 MeowMeow 
 Black Dress 
 Intro 
 Like This 
 Gorilla 
 Can You Feel It 
 Spectacular 
 Shine 
 Lonely 
 Can't Let You Go, Even If I Die (죽어도못보내) 
 This Song 
 Follow Your Dreams 
 Movie 
 It's Okay 
 Blowin' Up 
 Lip & Hip 
 Babe 
 Roll Deep  
 Dance Performance  
 Mermaid  
 365Fresh and new song spoiler 
 Animal 
 She's Gone 
 Red 
 How's This? 
 Change 
 Bubble Pop! 
 Someday 
 Missing You 
 Our Concert 
 Upgrade  

Encore + Kuanlin VCR
 Artist Song Medley
 Shake It

Media

Notes
  Lai Kuan-lin made a surprise visit at the end of the concert.

References

External links
 Tv 
 Apple Store 
 Android 

K-pop concerts